The Great Western Railway Victoria Class were  broad gauge steam locomotives for passenger train work. This class was introduced into service in two batches between August 1856 and May 1864. They were all withdrawn between 1876 and December 1880.

The first eight locomotives were named after ruling heads of state, but the remaining locomotives received the names of famous engineers, starting with the railway's own Isambard Kingdom Brunel. This theme was continued with the Hawthorn Class that followed.

Locomotives
 Abdul Medjid (1856 - 1877)
This locomotive was named after Abdul Medjid of Turkey.
 Alexander (1856 - 1878)
This locomotive was named in honour of Alexander II of Russia.
 Brindley (1863 - 1879)
This locomotive was named after James Brindley, the first canal builder.
 Brunel (1863 - 1879)
This locomotive worked the last broad gauge train in Wales on 11 May 1872. It was named after the Great Western Railway's much respected engineer, Isambard Kingdom Brunel, who had died in 1859.
 Fulton (1863 - 1876)
This locomotive was named after Robert Fulton, who developed steam-powered ships.
 Leopold (1856 - 1877)
This locomotive was named in honour of Leopold I of Belgium.
 Locke (1863 - 1881)
This locomotive was named after the railway engineer, Joseph Locke.
 Napoleon (1856 - 1880)
This locomotive was named in honour of Napoleon I of France
 Oscar (1856 - 1880)
This locomotive was named for King Oscar I of Sweden.
 Otho (1856 - 1880)
This locomotive was named in honour of King Otto of Greece.
 Rennie (1863 - 1878)
This locomotive was named after the engineer, John Rennie.
 Smeaton (1863 - 1877)
This locomotive was named after the engineer, John Smeaton.
 Stephenson (1863 - 1878)
This locomotive was named after Robert Stephenson.
 Telford (1863 - 1879)
This locomotive was named after the engineer, Thomas Telford.
 Trevethick (1863 - 1878)
This locomotive was named after Richard Trevithick who built the first working railway locomotives.
 Victor Emmanuel (1856 - 1878)
This locomotive was named after Victor Emmanuel II of Italy.
 Victoria (1856 - 1879)
On 26 August 1862 Victoria ran away descending towards Weymouth, it crashed through the buffers and ended up in the street outside the station. It was named in honour of Queen Victoria.
 Watt (1863 - 1880)
This locomotive was named after James Watt.

References

 
 
 

Victoria
2-4-0 locomotives
Broad gauge (7 feet) railway locomotives
Railway locomotives introduced in 1856